is a Japanese voice actor who works for Office Kaoru.

Filmography
Beyblade G-Revolution, Rick
Bubblegum Crisis 2040, Kuzui
Divergence Eve, Morozov
Dokyusei 2, Yoshiki Nagaoka
El-Hazard, Katsuo
Full Metal Panic!, Arbalest
Fullmetal Alchemist, Vato Falman
Ghost Stories, Reiichiro Miyanoshita
Jikuu Tenshou Nazca, Takuma Dan
Nightmare Campus, Akira Mido
Demon Beast Resurrection, Muneto
Macross 7, Michael
Magical Girl Pretty Sammy, Shigeki Amano
Sins of the Flesh, Adolpho
Monster, Junkers
Onmyou Taisenki, Shoukaku
Sci-fi Harry, Catherine's Father
Legend of the Blue Wolves, Subordinate
Urotsukidoji: New saga, Narrator; Doctor
Tenchi in Tokyo, Umanosuke Tsuchida
Tokimeki Memorial 2, Sakunoshin Mihara
Twelve Kingdoms, Kakugo
Digimon Savers, Duftmon
Rave Master, Let
Bokurano: Ours, Tamotsu Sakakibara
Sexy Sailor Soldiers, Monster
You're Under Arrest (manga),Delinquent, Erihito Akamoto, Kazu, Male Officer, Police Executive, Yoshida, Young Man, Oldman, Dracula & Nobuyuki Sugihara

Tokusatsu
Tetsuwan Tantei Robotack, Kabados
Zyuden Sentai Kyoryuger, Debo Akidamonne (ep. 33)
Zyuden Sentai Kyoryuger Returns: Hundred Years After, Debo Akidamonne
Kaitou Sentai Lupinranger VS Keisatsu Sentai Patranger, Dugon Manattee (ep. 40)

Dubbing
American Reunion, Chris "Oz" Ostreicher (Chris Klein)
Autumn in My Heart, Yoon Joon-suh (Song Seung-heon)
The Fan, Juan Primo (Benicio del Toro)
FBI: Most Wanted, Clinton Skye (Nathaniel Arcand)
I Know What You Did Last Summer, Ray Bronson (Freddie Prinze Jr.)
A Knight's Tale, William Thatcher (Heath Ledger)
Monrak Transistor, Siew (Ampon Rattanawong)

References

External links
Takehiro Murozono at Ryu's Seiyuu Infos
 

1969 births
Male voice actors from Kanagawa Prefecture
Living people
Japanese male voice actors
20th-century Japanese male actors
21st-century Japanese male actors